Treville is a comune (municipality) in the Province of Alessandria in the Italian region Piedmont, located about  east of Turin and about  northwest of Alessandria.

Treville borders the following municipalities: Cereseto, Ozzano Monferrato, and Sala Monferrato.

Demographic evolution

References

Cities and towns in Piedmont